Petrophile pulchella, commonly known as conesticks, is a common shrub of the family Proteaceae and is found in eastern Australia. The leaves are divided with needle-shaped but soft pinnae, the flowers silky-hairy, cream-coloured and arranged in oval heads and the fruit are arranged in oval heads. Conesticks grows on shallow sandstone soils, often in open forest or heathlands near the coast. It is also occasionally seen on the adjacent ranges.

Description
The branchlets and leaves are softly-hairy at first but become glabrous with age. The two other species in eastern Australia, P. canescens and P. sessilis, both have finely hairy new growth.

Taxonomy
The shrub was first formally described in 1796 by Heinrich Schrader and Johann Christoph Wendland who gave it the name Protea pulchella in Sertum Hannoveranum, from the original specimen collected at Botany Bay. In 1810, the prolific botanist Robert Brown reclassified it in the new genus Petrophile as P. pulchella, publishing the name change in Transactions of the Linnean Society of London. The specific epithet pulchella meaning “beautiful” is derived from Latin, although noted plant author John Wrigley feels it to be somewhat of a misnomer. Joseph Knight, who had propagated and cultivated it successfully in England by 1809, reported, "It has few claims to a place in our collections."

Distribution and habitat
Petrophile pulchella is found from south-eastern Queensland and south along the coast and adjacent tablelands to Jervis Bay in New South Wales. It often grows with trees such as Sydney peppermint (Eucalyptus piperita), smooth-barked apple (Angophora costata) or more open woodland e.g. with scribbly gum (Eucalyptus sclerophylla), silvertop ash (E. sieberi) or with shrubs such as mountain devil (Lambertia formosa), broad-leaved drumsticks (Isopogon anemonifolius) and paperbark tea-tree (Leptospermum trinervium).

Ecology
Conesticks is killed by fire and regenerates afterwards by canopy-stored seedbank. Plants can live up to 60 years in nature. A field study in Brisbane Water National Park found that Petrophile pulchella had greater reproductive output in areas that had had two short intervals of under seven years between fires, over areas that had had one short interval, and that plants in these latter areas had greater reproductive output than areas with no intervals under seven years between fires. Seeds can germinate up to 700 days after a bushfire, and it is possible that the seedbank could theoretically last up to 90 years between fires. Native bees are possible pollinators of this species.

References

Flora of New South Wales
Flora of Queensland
pulchella
Plants described in 1796
Taxa named by Johann Christoph Wendland